Alexander Mikhailovich Babakov (8 February 1963) is a Russian politician and member of the State Duma, the Russian parliament. He was appointed Special Presidential Representative to Russians by Vladimir Putin in 2012.

He has been under EU, Canadian and Swiss sanctions since 2014, as well as US sanctions since 2017.

Political activity 
He is a member of the Foreign Affairs Committee, Deputy Co-chairman of Inter-Parliamentary Group of the Russian Federation, Head of Delegation of the State Duma in the Inter-Parliamentary Union and Chairman of State Duma Commission on legal support to military and defense industrial complex of the Russian Federation. He was appointed Deputy speaker of the Duma in 2010, a position he held until December 2011.

In June 2012 he was appointed as Presidential Envoy for engaging with Russian organizations abroad by President Putin.

He was the leader of Rodina, a political party in Russia, for several months in 2006 and organised the formation of A Just Russia, a merger between Rodina, the Russian Party of Life and the Russian Pensioners' Party, sitting on its governing committee.

Between 2006 and 2007 he led A Just Russia's faction in the State Duma as the party leader, Sergei Mironov, served as speaker of the Federation Council of Russia.

He was elected to the Russian State Duma in 2003 and became party leader of Rodina in March 2006 following the surprise resignation of Dmitry Rogozin.

Sanctions and legal action 
In September 2014, following the Annexation of Crimea by the Russian Federation and the wider Russo-Ukrainian War, Babakov was subjected to sanctions, including an asset freeze, by the European Union.

On 14 April 2022 the United States Department of Justice issued an indictment against Babakov for "conspiring to have US citizens act as an unregistered agent for Russia in the United States, conspiring to violate and evade US sanctions, and conspiring to commit visa fraud."

Financial interests 
According to anti-corruption investigations, including material published by Alexei Navalny, Babakov owns a heritage-listed estate in Saint-Léger-en-Yvelines, France and an apartment on Rue de l'Université in the wealthy 7th arrondissement of Paris.

He was also reported to own a residential flat in Richmond Court, Knightsbridge, London 

In 2011 Babakov passed ownership of his British Virgin Islands registered holding company AED International to his daughter.

Personal life 
He is married and has three children.

Awards
 Order of Friendship (2008)
 Order "For Merit to the Fatherland" (2020)
 Order of Honour (2017) 
 Sretenje Order (2013)

References

External links 
 Rodina Duma Deputies
 Forbes

1963 births
Living people
Politicians from Chișinău
Rodina (political party) politicians
A Just Russia politicians
United Russia politicians
Fourth convocation members of the State Duma (Russian Federation)
Fifth convocation members of the State Duma (Russian Federation)
Sixth convocation members of the State Duma (Russian Federation)
Russian Jews
Russian individuals subject to the U.S. Department of the Treasury sanctions
Eighth convocation members of the State Duma (Russian Federation)
Members of the Federation Council of Russia (after 2000)
Russian individuals subject to European Union sanctions